The name Peter (or Pete) has been used for five tropical cyclones worldwide.

In the Atlantic Ocean:
 Tropical Storm Peter (2003), a strong off-season tropical storm that formed in the open ocean, northwest of the Cape Verde islands.
 Tropical Storm Peter (2021), a weak and poorly organized tropical storm that stayed at sea.

In the Australian Region:
 Cyclone Peter (1979), the wettest tropical cyclone on record in the region, caused damage throughout the Gulf of Carpentaria.
 Cyclone Pete (1999)

In the Western North Pacific:
 Typhoon Peter (1997) (T9708, 09W, Daling), a weak Category 1 typhoon that made landfall in Japan.

Atlantic hurricane set index articles
Pacific typhoon set index articles
Australian region cyclone set index articles